Thomas Albert Work (November 21, 1870 – April 17, 1963) was an American businessman and banker of Pacific Grove, California, known around Monterey as T. A. Work. He was owner of the T. A. Work company that made him the single largest business property owner on the Monterey Peninsula. He owned several banks, including the First National Bank of Monterey, Bank of Pacific Grove, Salinas, and the Bank of Carmel.

Early life 

T. A. Work was born in Shetland Islands, off the coast of Scotland, on November 21, 1870. He was the son of Thomas Albert Work (1833-1894), who was a minister and the grandson of a sea captain who had made three trips to California before 1849. His grandfather, Thomas Work, told Work that the coast of Monterey, California was "one of the most beautiful areas in the world." One can speculate that this influenced his grandson to travel to Monterey. In 1883, his brother, already living in Monterey, John Robertson Work (1860-1940), arranged to have T. A. Work live with a family in a house built on the Upper Monterey Mesa, now along the Alta Mesa Road in Monterey. The family operated a dairy that supplied Monterey and Pacific Grove residents with milk. This was his first job delivering milk for George Bodfish for $15 a month. He then quit his milk route to help rebuild the Hotel Del Monte after a fire destroyed the hotel in 1887.

Work married Maude Elise Porter (1873-1946), a schoolteacher, on August 14, 1895, in Monterey. She was born in the Mother Lode area of Georgetown, California.

Professional background

In 1889, T. A. Work was a wholesale and retail dealer in stove wood, hay, grain, ground barley, bran, and flour. He also contracted for street work and furnished gravel in Pacific Grove.

T. A. Work company

In 1895, Work started the T. A. Work Company, a lumber yard on the north side of Laurel Avenue between Forest Avenue and 7th Street in Pacific Grove. He had been in the lumber and milling business for 15 years, building sheds and other structures. He built several of the buildings in Pacific Grove including the three-story Del Mar hotel in 1895, at the corner of Sixteenth, and the first modern T. A. Work Theater in Monterey County, on Alvardo Street. 

T. A. Work became interested in real-estate early in his career. In 1896, he purchased  in Carmel Highlands, California, where the Highlands Inn is now. In 1898, he sold the land to developers Frank Powers and Frank Devendorf. He then sold firewood and opened a feed store selling hay and grain.

Work was responsible for the construction of the Carmel Development Company Building in 1903, on the northwest corner of San Carlos Street and Ocean Avenue. It has a flat roof and its exterior wall covering is made up of hollow core "fireproof" concrete blocks. The concrete wall cladding for the building was made by the Wizard Face Down Concrete Block Machine made by the Sears and Roebuck Company. The building originally housed the Carmel Development Company of Frank Powers and  Franklin Devendorf, the T. A. Work Hardware Company, and Devendorf's Preble Grocery.

In 1904, he built a commercial block along Lighthouse Avenue, between Forest and Grand Avenues in Pacific Grove. From 1905 to 1906, he continued to improve and expand the commercial block for the local businesses. By 1909, the T. A. Work Company had become one of the most successful commercial businesses in the Monterey Peninsula. His company furnished lumber for most of the buildings in Monterey, and built many of the homes in Pacific Grove.

In 1913, he purchased  from the David Jacks family, an area stretching form Seaside, California to Marina. He grew the biggest pea ranch in the world. He sold the land to the government so they could build the Fort Ord military base at the start of World War II. In 1906, he bought 6,000 acres of land from the Jacks estate, extending from the Del Monte hotel to Corral de Teirra.

Banking business

In 1900, Work purchased the First National Bank of Monterey, acquiring it in 1906. He was president of the bank for more than twenty years. He started banks in Carmel, Hollister, Pebble Beach, Seaside, and Salinas. The two-story Romanesque style Bank of Pacific Grove opened in 1904, on Lighthouse Road.

In May 1923, T. A. Work, organized and was elected president of the Bank of Carmel. The Bank of Carmel began with capital stock of $25,000 and with capitalization of $100,000. It was Carmel's first commercial bank and the only 1930s Art Deco style building in Carmel.

La Mirada

Work and his family resided in Pacific Grove until Gouverneur Morris's historic estate, La Mirada became available in the 1930s. La Mirada was once owned by Antonio Mario Castro. When Work's daughter, Betty Work, purchased La Mirada at 720 Vía Mirada, in Monterey, Work's family moved into the old adobe home. When T. A. Work's wife passed away on May 2, 1946, Betty sold the La Mirada to her brother Frank, who continued to live there until he gifted the land to the Monterey Museum of Art in 1983. The Museum has expanded La Mirada with modern galleries and exhibitions.

Later, T. A. Work remarried to Elinore Coe, an Army colonel's widow, and relocated to Pebble Beach.

Death

Work died on April 17, 1963, at the age of 92, in Monterey, California. He was buried at the El Encinal Cemetery in Monterey, California.

His grandson, Thomas Albert Work III, gave a painting of a T. A. Work portrait, to the Monterey Museum of Art, La Mirada facility, for their art gallery. The painting was once in his grandparents' home in Monterey.

See also
Carmel-by-the-Sea, California

References

External links

1870 births
1963 deaths
People from California
Scottish people